Birrie River, a perennial river that is part of the Upper Darling catchment within the Murray–Darling basin, is located in the north-west slopes region of New South Wales, Australia.

See also

 Rivers of New South Wales

References

External links
 

Tributaries of the Darling River